The Karakoro River is a small seasonal tributary of the Sénégal River that forms part of the Mauritania-Mali border. The source of the river is northeast of Kiffa in Mauritania. The river flows south in the flat sahel region of southern Mauritania, crossing a number of shallow depressions, before joining the Sénégal River on the left bank a few kilometres downstream of the small Malian town of Ambidedi.

References

 

Rivers of Mali
Rivers of Mauritania
Senegal River
International rivers of Africa
Mali–Mauritania border